Early Islam may refer to:

Early Muslim conquests
Early social changes under Islam

See also
History of Islam